was a Japanese professional baseball pitcher and manager. He spent his entire career with the Yomiuri Giants of Nippon Professional Baseball, winning two Japan Series titles as a player and two more as manager.

External links

1931 births
Baseball people from Ehime Prefecture
Japanese baseball players
Managers of baseball teams in Japan
Yomiuri Giants players
Yomiuri Giants managers
Nippon Professional Baseball Rookie of the Year Award winners
Nippon Professional Baseball MVP Award winners
2006 deaths
Japanese Baseball Hall of Fame inductees